Nasturtium microphyllum, the onerow yellowcress, is an aquatic plant species widespread across Europe and Asia, and naturalized in the United States, Canada, Mexico, Central America, Australia, New Zealand and other places. It occurs in wet locations generally at elevations less than 1500 m. It has been reported from every Canadian province except Nova Scotia and Saskatchewan. In the US, it is fairly common in New England, New York, and Michigan, with scattered populations in the southern and western parts of the country.

References

External links
Biota of North America Program, distribution map, Nasturtium microphyllum

microphyllum
Freshwater plants
Herbs
Leaf vegetables
Medicinal plants
Perennial vegetables
Flora of Canada
Flora of Europe
Flora of Asia
Flora of Australia
Flora of Mexico
Flora of Central America
Flora of the United States
Plants described in 1832
Taxa named by Ludwig Reichenbach